Lidbeckia is a genus of South African flowering plants in the chamomile tribe within the daisy family.

Name in honour of Eric Gustavius Lidbeck (1724–1803), formerly Professor of Botany at Lund, Sweden.

 Species
 Lidbeckia pectinata P.J.Bergius 
 Lidbeckia quinqueloba (L.f.) Cass.

References

Endemic flora of South Africa
Asteraceae genera
Anthemideae